Johannes de Limburgia (also Johannes de Lymburgia or Johannes Vinandi; fl. 1408–1430) was a Franco-Flemish School composer.

History
His name indicates that he is from the Duchy of Limburg (or perhaps the city itself). He worked at churches in Liège in 1408–19, was succentor at Saint-Jean-l'Évangéliste there in 1426, and in Italy c. 1430, perhaps in Venice, or Vicenza and/or Padua, for which cities he wrote motets. Like Arnold and Hugo de Lantins he stands out among his contemporaries by virtue of the large number of his surviving works: about 50 in the Q15 Manuscript (Bologna, International museum and library of music) and a Mass Ordinary in the Trent Codices.

References

Renaissance composers
Male classical composers
People from Limburg (Belgium)